Chicago Livestock World was a daily newspaper published at the Union Stock Yards in Chicago, Illinois in 1900. Located in Chicago's meatpacking district, it reported information about the livestock market, agricultural advice, advertisements, and world news. The slogan on the masthead read: "World's Greatest Farm Newspaper." It was edited and managed by Ashleigh C. Halliwell and Will F. Baum.

References

External links
 Illinois Digital Newspaper Collections: Chicago Livestock World (1902-1917)

Defunct newspapers published in Chicago
1990 establishments in Illinois